Iosefin is a historic district of Timișoara. Its name comes from that of Emperor Joseph II, during whose reign it was founded. Unlike most of the other Timișoara districts, the historic Iosefin is not divided into further districts or residential areas. However, mostly in the 1970s, numerous new development areas with their own names (but without an administrative function) emerged on the southern edge of Iosefin. They are called Dâmbovița, Șagului Vest I, Șagului Vest II and Steaua.

History 
Until after 1716, the area of present-day Iosefin was not inhabited. There were no constructions here (except for the so-called "Roman entrenchment", whose actual date of execution is unknown, but which crossed present-day Iosefin). The original core of Iosefin was approved in 1744. Located southwest of the 948-meter-wide non ædificandi belt, it had three main streets: the present-day Dragalina, Bolintineanu–Văcărescu and Pop de Băsești–Maniu streets. Originally called Noile Maiere Germane, Iosefin was designed from the beginning as a village of German settlers, on both sides of the Bega Canal. The houses had luxuriant gardens, used by the bourgeoisie in Cetate as refuges. Its current name was given in 1773 in honor of Emperor Joseph II, after his second visit to Timișoara (Joseph II first visited Timișoara in 1767).

Iosefin had a rural aspect until the connection of Timișoara to the railway system of Central Europe in 1857, when the first railway station of the city was built north of this district. In the area between Bega and the railway station, the construction of factories spurred in the second half of the 19th century. At that time, alcohol, tobacco, matches, hats, silk, butter, chains and machines, among others, were produced here.

Buildings and structures 
Apart from the Roman Catholic church, which was built between 1774–1775, all the buildings in Iosefin are built after 1868, most of them around 1900. There are numerous buildings in historicist/eclectic style, typical of the second half of the 19th century, as well as some valuable architectural ensembles in the 1900s style with its specific stylistic derivations – Art Nouveau, Jugendstil or Secession. Today, the old district of Iosefin is a protected urban site of national importance.

Places of worship

Palaces 
 Anchor Palace (1902)
 Gemeinhardt Palace (1912)
 Gudenus Palace (1913)
 Csermák Twin Palaces (1912)
 former Délvidéki Casino (1905)
 Hochstrasser Palace (1914)
 Miksa Palace (1912)
 Pisică Palace (1912)
 Schott Palace (1913)
 Water Palace (1901)

Bridges 
 Heroes' Bridge
 Iron Bridge
 Labor Bridge 
 Stephen the Great Bridge
 Trajan Bridge

References 

Districts of Timișoara